Donald Russell Stanley (October 18, 1917 – September 21, 2001) was a Canadian ice hockey player with the Edmonton Mercurys. He won a gold medal at the 1950 World Ice Hockey Championships in London, England. The 1950 Edmonton Mercurys team was inducted to the Alberta Sports Hall of Fame in 2011. He also played with the Edmonton Flyers, University of Alberta Golden Bears and Dartmouth RCAF  hockey teams.

Stanley later attended Harvard University where he earned master's and doctorate degrees in environmental engineering. He founded Stanley Associates Engineering in 1954, which later became Stantec.

References

1917 births
2001 deaths
Canadian ice hockey left wingers
Ice hockey people from Edmonton
Alberta Golden Bears ice hockey players
Harvard School of Engineering and Applied Sciences alumni